Cartel is a 1995 Turkish hip hop CD project involving three groups of rappers from different German cities, which received attention and popularity in both Turkey and Germany. It was notable for using samples of traditional Turkish music instruments in hip hop music.  Cartel was the first Turkish-language project to get off the ground and often credited as the group that ignited "Oriental hip hop".

During Cartel's short career, the band gave around 120 extremely successful concerts in Turkey, Germany, Switzerland, Austria, the Netherlands and France. Cartel is the only hip-hop group that managed to fill Istanbul's İnönü Stadium (as of December 2006). In addition to German and Turkish-speaking media, BBC London also reported on the group, as did the music channels VIVA and MTV.

In Turkey, where the band, which also appears in English, Spanish and German, has remained most successful, Cartel has sold more than half a million CDs through official sales to date. On February 4, 2011 the group released their new album Bugünkü Neşen Cartel'den and their new video Bir Oluruz, but without Kabus Kerim.

Discography

References

Crossover (music)
Musical groups established in 1995
German hip hop groups
Turkish hip hop groups